Dorian Mortelette (born 24 November 1983 in Armentières) is a French rower. He competed at the 2008 Summer Olympics, where he won a bronze medal in coxless four and at the 2012 Summer Olympics, where he won a silver medal in the pair with Germain Chardin. He is a member of Boulogne 92 since 2019.

References

External links
 Bio on results.beijing2008.cn
Dorian Mortelette  on ffaviron.fr

Living people
French male rowers
Olympic silver medalists for France
Olympic bronze medalists for France
Olympic rowers of France
Rowers at the 2008 Summer Olympics
Rowers at the 2012 Summer Olympics
Rowers at the 2016 Summer Olympics
1983 births
Olympic medalists in rowing
Medalists at the 2012 Summer Olympics
Medalists at the 2008 Summer Olympics
People from Armentières
World Rowing Championships medalists for France
Sportspeople from Nord (French department)
European Rowing Championships medalists
21st-century French people